Edem is both a surname and a given name. Notable people with the name include:

Surname:
Ayigbe Edem, Ghanaian musician
Samuel Edem, Nigerian diplomat

Given name:
Edem Kodjo (born 1938), Togolese politician
Edem Mortotsi (born 1993), Ghanaian footballer
Edem Muradosilov, Soviet canoeist
Jesse Edem Cleverson (born 1994), Ghanaian innovator
Edem Atovor (born 1994), Ghanaian footballer

Edem Edem(born 1988), Pastor from Oron in Akwa Ibom, Nigeria